Chichester railway station is a railway station in the city of Chichester in West Sussex, England.

The station is located on the Brighton to Portsmouth line of the LBSCR. Passenger services are operated under the brand name West Coastway Line which runs between Brighton and Southampton. The station and all passenger services are operated by Southern.

The station opened in 1846 and by the 1920's was listed in the top ten most prestigious Southern Railway stations due to royal use for Goodwood Racecourse race days. By the 1950's the station had become dilapidated and was demolished and replaced with the modern station, which re-opened in 1961.

There used to be a branch line north to Midhurst and an additional two platforms which were up and down bay platforms at the west end of the station on the north side. An additional bay platform on the south side remains in situ but is disused.

Services
Services at Chichester are operated by Southern using  and  EMUs.

The typical off peak service in trains per hour is:
 2 tph to  via 
 2 tph to  via 
 1 tph to 
 2 tph to 

Until May 2022, Great Western Railway operated limited services between Brighton, Portsmouth Harbour and Bristol Temple Meads that called at Chichester.

References

External links

Chichester
Former London, Brighton and South Coast Railway stations
Railway stations in Great Britain opened in 1846
Railway stations in West Sussex
DfT Category C2 stations
Railway stations served by Govia Thameslink Railway
1846 establishments in England